After Eden is the third studio album by the Japanese girl group Kalafina.

Track listing

Usage in media
Magia: ending theme for anime television series Puella Magi Madoka Magica
Kagayaku Sora no Shijima ni wa: insert song for anime television series Kuroshitsuji II
symphonia: ending theme for NHK program "Rekishi Hiwa Historia II"

Charts

References

External links
Oricon profile
After Eden special site

2011 albums
Kalafina albums
Japanese-language albums
SME Records albums